The heart of any Kiribati community is its maneaba or meeting house.  The maneaba is not just the biggest building in any village, it is the centre of village life and the basis of island and national governance.

A traditional maneaba is an imposing structure, with slabs of coral supporting a huge roof formed from coconut wood, held together with coconut string and thatched with pandanus leaves.  The whole community is involved in its construction, and every aspect of the maneaba has a symbolic as well as a practical function.

A maneaba serves a similar cultural role to a Polynesian marae. In the neighbouring islands of Tuvalu (formerly called the Ellice Islands), the meeting house is called the maneapa. The sharing of the name is the result of Kiribati and Tuvalu being previously the British crown colony of the Gilbert and Ellice Islands.

The House of Assembly (Kiribati) or Government of Kiribati is referred to as the Maneaba ni Maungatabu, or maneaba of the Sacred Mountain.

Bibliography 

.
.
.

References

Kiribati culture